An amanuensis is a person employed to write or type what another dictates or to copy what has been written by another, and also refers to a person who signs a document on behalf of another under the latter's authority. In one example Eric Fenby assisted the blind composer Frederick Delius in writing down the notes that Delius dictated.

Origin and secretarial uses

The word originated in ancient Rome, for a slave at his master's personal service "within hand's reach", performing any command; later it was specifically applied to an intimately trusted servant (often a freedman) acting as a personal secretary (amanuensis is what he does, not what he is).

In the Bible, the Apostle Paul is shown as the author of the Book of Romans. However, at the end of the book, Tertius of Iconium describes himself as the scribe who wrote the letter.

A similar semantic evolution occurred at the French royal court, where the secrétaire de la main du roi, originally a lowly clerk specializing in producing, at royal command, the Sovereign's signature on more documents than he cared to put his pen to, developed into the secrétaires d'état, the first permanent portfolio ministers, to which the British Secretaries of State would be the counterpart.

Uses
It is also used in some academic contexts, when an injured or disabled person is helped by an amanuensis at a written examination. The word was also used when Eric Fenby assisted the blind composer Frederick Delius in writing down the notes that Delius dictated.

In the Netherlands it refers to a (technically schooled) physics, chemistry or biology laboratory assistant responsible for preparing and assisting with or conducting laboratory demonstrations and maintaining the instruments. When employed as such in a school environment they will have the title of "TOA" ("technisch-onderwijsassistent", i.e. Technical Teaching Assistant).

In Norway, amanuensis is an academic rank of a lecturer with a doctorate. Førsteamanuensis (Norwegian for "first amanuensis") is the equivalent of associate professor.

In Sweden, amanuens is used to denote roughly a teaching assistant at university who either continues with their own scientific work, or who works as an administrative assistant at the department where they study. The title can also be used for a civil servant at archives or museums.

In Finland, amanuenssi is an administrative employee of a university, research institution or museum. In Finnish universities, amanuenses can be involved with student guidance counseling, organising course activities etc. In Finnish universities' schools of medicine, the title of "amanuenssi" is reserved for students working under guidance and supervision in hospitals, a mandatory part of medical studies. In Finnish museums they generally are working with the museum's collections.

The term is also used to describe someone who assists an organist during a performance, by drawing and retiring stops, and by turning pages, although the more common term is "registrant."

Modern religious uses

Amanuensis is also used in New Thought and mystical religious movements — such as Church Universal and Triumphant — to describe the role of a person receiving dictation from one of the Ascended Masters. For example, Mark L. Prophet — religious leader and founder of the Summit Lighthouse — claims to have written down dictation from El Morya. In doing so, he would have served as El Morya's amanuensis.

Job titles

Amanuesis is a dated job title sometimes used by employers for unskilled or manual labourers at the bottom of the company hierarchy, for example as factotum. During the 19th and early 20th century, an amanuensis was the job title for male secretaries who were employed by the railroad or ship to be available for travelers who required services en route.

The title is also used for officer positions in some collegiate debate and literary societies, including the Philodemic Society of Georgetown University. The Amanuensis records the official proceedings of these societies.

A similar term, Handlanger, exists in German and Dutch (nowadays in Germany its negative connotation of an unscrupulous, low person acting as criminal assistant prevails whereas the original use of this term for an unskilled and possibly also illiterate person assisting, in the literal sense of lending a hand at construction works has become rather rare). The term, handlanger, is also used in Afrikaans, but mostly without the criminal undertones; handlanger typically refers to an aide, helper or handyman.

Notes

References
Non-English language sources
Bokmålsordboka (the official Norwegian language dictionary)
Pauly-Wissowa (an encyclopaedia of classical antiquity, in German)
Larousse (a general encyclopaedia in French)

English language sources

 
 
 
 
 
 
Deissmann, G. Adolf. Bible Studies. Trans. Alexander Grieve. 1901. Peabody: Hendrickson, 1988.
Doty, William G. Letters in Primitive Christianity. Guides to Biblical Scholarship. New Testament. Ed. Dan O. Via Jr. Philadelphia: Fortress, 1988.
Gamble, Harry Y. “Amanuensis.” Anchor Bible Dictionary. Vol. 1. Ed. David Noel Freedman. New York: Doubleday, 1992.
 
Longenecker, Richard N. “Ancient Amanuenses and the Pauline Epistles.” New Dimensions in New Testament Study. Eds. Richard N. Longenecker and Merrill C. Tenney. Grand Rapids: Zondervan, 1974. 281–97. idem, “On the Form, Function, and Authority of the New Testament Letters.” Scripture and Truth. Eds. D.A. Carson and John D. Woodbridge. Grand Rapids: Zondervan, 1983. 101–14.
Murphy-O’Connor, Jerome. Paul the Letter-Writer: His World, His Options, His Skills. Collegeville, MN: Liturgical, 1995.
Richards, E. Randolph. The Secretary in the Letters of Paul. Tübingen: Mohr, 1991. idem, “The Codex and the Early Collection of Paul’s Letters.” Bulletin for Biblical Research 8 (1998):  151–66. idem, Paul and First-Century Letter Writing: Secretaries, Composition, and Collection. Downers Grove: InterVarsity, 2004.
 
Stowers, Stanley K. Letter Writing in Greco-Roman Antiquity. Library of Early Christianity. Vol. 8. Ed. Wayne A. Meeks. Philadelphia: Westminster, 1989.
Wall, Robert W. “Introduction to Epistolary Literature.” New Interpreter’s Bible. Vol. 10. Ed. Leander E. Keck. Nashville:  Abingdon, 2002. 369–91.

External links

 Quote, via Goodreads: "I'd be churched to death, bridge-partied to death, called upon to give book reviews at the Amanuensis Club, expected to become a part of the community. It takes a lot of what I don't have to be a member of this wedding." ― Harper Lee, Go Set a Watchman

 
Domestic work
Office and administrative support occupations